Alan Alexander may refer to:

 Alan Alexander (academic) (born 1943), Scottish academic, writer and public servant
 Alan Alexander (footballer) (born 1941), Scottish footballer